Club Sol de América is a Paraguayan sports club, mostly known for its football team. The club is located in Barrio Obrero, Paraguay, and it was founded in 1909. The stadium Sol de America uses for most of its first division games is located in the suburb city of Villa Elisa on the border of the capital city, Asunción. Sol de America have won the Paraguayan First Division title on two occasions, in 1986 and then again in 1991. They also have a strong basketball team and an athletics department.

Football

Honours
Paraguayan First Division: 2
1986, 1991

Paraguayan Second Division: 3
1965, 1977, 2006

Performance in CONMEBOL competitions
Copa Libertadores: 6 appearances
Best: Quarter-finals in 1989
1989: Quarter-finals

Current squad
As of 6 March 2022.

Notable players
To appear in this section a player must have either:
 Played at least 125 games for the club.
 Set a club record or won an individual award while at the club.
 Been part of a national team at any time.
 Played in the first division of any other football association (outside of Paraguay).
 Played in a continental and/or intercontinental competition.

1970's
 Secundino Aifuch (1971–75)
1990's
 Gustavo Neffa (1996–98)
2000's
 Enrique Vera (2000–02)
 Fabián Caballero (2000)
 Cristian Bogado (2004)
 Pablo Zeballos (2005–07)
 Miguel Ángel Cuéllar (2007)
  Josías Paulo Cardoso Júnior (2009–2011)
2010's
  Glacinei Martins (2010–2011)
  Sebastian Abreu (2016–)
Non-CONMEBOL players
 Abraham Francois (2001)
 Massimiliano Ammendola (2013–14)

Managers
 Ferenc Puskás (1985–86)
 Sergio Markarián (1987–89)
 Ever Hugo Almeida (Jan 1, 1997 – Jan 1, 1999), (Jan 1, 2000 – Jan 1, 2001)
 Ricardo Dabrowski (Sept 11, 2011 – April 5, 2013)
 Gualberto Jara (April 9, 2013 – Sept 23, 2013)
 Mauricio Larriera (Sept 24, 2013 – Oct 25, 2013)
 Roberto Pompei (Dec 11, 2013–14)
 Daniel Garnero (2015–)

Other sports

Athletics

Sol de América also has an athletics department affiliated with the Federación Paraguaya de Atletismo. Physical preparers of the club are Edgar Torres and 2004, 2008 and 2012 Summer Olympics javelin thrower Leryn Franco.

Basketball
Sol de América also has a basketball team participating in the Paraguayan Metropolitan Basketball League.

Paraguayan Championship: 9
1982, 1983, 1984, 1995, 1996, 1998, 1999, 2007, 2010, 2011

See also
List of athletics clubs in Paraguay

References

External links

Paraguayan Soccer Info

 
Football clubs in Paraguay
Basketball teams in Paraguay
Association football clubs established in 1909
1909 establishments in Paraguay